David M. Morse (born October 31, 1954) is a Canadian politician in Nova Scotia. He represented the electoral district of Kings South in the Nova Scotia House of Assembly from 1999 to 2009 as a member of the Progressive Conservatives.

Early life and education
Morse graduated with a Bachelor of Arts from Mount Allison University, and then received a master's degree in Business Administration from McMaster University. Morse was a self-employed life and disability insurance broker before running for politics in 1999.

Political career
Morse first attempted to enter provincial politics in 1998, running as the Progressive Conservative candidate in Kings South.  He finished third in the 1998 election, losing to Liberal incumbent Robbie Harrison. In the 1999 election, Morse was again nominated as the Progressive Conservative candidate in the riding, this time defeating Harrison. Morse was re-elected in the 2003 and 2006 elections.

On January 18, 2001, Morse was appointed to the Executive Council of Nova Scotia as Minister of Environment and Labour. In a December 2002 cabinet shuffle, Morse was named Minister of Community Services. He retained that post following both the 2003 election, and the swearing-in of the Rodney MacDonald government in February 2006. Following the 2006 election, Morse was shuffled to Minister of Natural Resources. In January 2009, Morse was named Minister of Environment, Minister of Emergency Management, and Minister Responsible for Military Relations. In the 2009 election, Morse was defeated by NDP candidate Ramona Jennex.

On October 27, 2010, Morse announced that was he was seeking the Conservative Party of Canada nomination in the riding of Kings—Hants for the 2011 federal election. He became the candidate on January 6, 2011, winning the nomination by acclamation. On election night, Morse was defeated by Liberal incumbent Scott Brison.

Morse was nominated again as the Conservative candidate in Kings—Hants for the 2015 federal election. On October 19, 2015, Brison defeated Morse by over 24,000 votes.

Personal life
Morse and his wife, Lynn Morse, have five children, three of whom are in the military.

Electoral record

|-
 
|New Democratic Party
|Ramona Jennex
|align="right"|4,038
|align="right"|41.18
|align="right"|
|-
 
|Progressive Conservative
|David Morse
|align="right"|2,759
|align="right"|28.14
|align="right"|
|-
 
|Liberal
|Paula Howatt
|align="right"|2,639
|align="right"|26.91
|align="right"|
|-

|}

|-
 
|Progressive Conservative
|David Morse
|align="right"|3,788
|align="right"|42.36
|align="right"|
|-
 
|New Democratic Party
|David Mangle
|align="right"|3,130
|align="right"|35.00
|align="right"|
|-
 
|Liberal
|Ray Savage
|align="right"|1,797
|align="right"|20.10
|align="right"|
|-

|}

|-
 
|Progressive Conservative
|David Morse
|align="right"|3,347
|align="right"|37.65
|align="right"|
|-
 
|New Democratic Party
|David Mangle
|align="right"|2,794
|align="right"|31.43
|align="right"|
|-
 
|Liberal
|Maura Ryan
|align="right"|2,682
|align="right"|30.17
|align="right"|

|}

|-
 
|Progressive Conservative
|David Morse
|align="right"|3,890
|align="right"|40.23
|align="right"|
|-
 
|Liberal
|Robbie Harrison
|align="right"|3,213
|align="right"|33.23
|align="right"|
|-
 
|New Democratic Party
|Mary DeWolfe
|align="right"|2,567
|align="right"|26.55
|align="right"|
|}

References

External links

Progressive Conservative Association of Nova Scotia MLAs
Living people
1954 births
Conservative Party of Canada candidates for the Canadian House of Commons
People from Kings County, Nova Scotia
Members of the Executive Council of Nova Scotia
Nova Scotia municipal councillors
Nova Scotia candidates for Member of Parliament